The Wendes Artillery Regiment, designation A 3, was a Swedish Army artillery regiment that traced its origins back to the 17th century. The regiment's soldiers were originally recruited from Scania, where it was garrisoned. The unit was disbanded as a result of the disarmament policies set forward in the Defence Act of 2000.

History 

The regiment has its origins in the Artillery Regiment raised in 1636. That regiment was split into four new regiments in 1794 of which Wendes Artillery Regiment was one. The regiment was given the designation A 3 (3rd Artillery Regiment) in 1830. In 1893 two companies were split off to form 2nd Svea Artillery Regiment and 2nd Göta Artillery Regiment. The regiment was garrisoned in Kristianstad but moved to Norra Åsum in 1953 and to Hässleholm in 1994 before being disbanded in 2000.

Campaigns 

?

Organisation 

?

Heraldry and traditions

Colours, standards and guidons
The standard of Wendes Artillery Regiment was embroidered by hand by mademoiselle Anette Bergner and presented as an honorary standard to the former mounted division of the Royal Wendes Artillery Regiment (A 3) in 1815. It was used as regimental standard by A 3 until 1 July 2000. Blazon: "On white cloth a winged cluster of flashes clasped by a hand under a royal crown proper, wings brown, crown and flash-cluster in yellow. In each corner a slanted open yellow crown. Yellow battle honours (Großbeeren 1813, Leipzig 1813, Dennewitz 1813) on the three lower sides of the standard. Fringe in white and yellow." Today it is presented as the second standard of the Artillery Regiment.

Coat of arms
The coat of the arms of the Wendes Artillery Regiment (A 3) 1977–2000. Blazon: "Gules, the regimental badge, a wyvern or, armed and langued azure. The shield surmounted two gunbarrels of older pattern in saltire or. The gunbarrels may be sable".

Commanding officers

1794–1797: C C Gyllenstierna
1797–1804: C Armfelt
1804–1807: J Norby
1807–1821: Carl Friedrich von Cardell
1821–1822: C A Hägerflycht
1822–1845: A G von Arbin
1845–1860: David Wilhelm Silfverstolpe
1860–1866: A Wachtmeister
1866–1871: C M Skytte
1871–1882: G M von Arbin
1882–1883: H E R Rehbinder
1883–1891: A O Ankarcrona
1891–1895: C A Francke
1895–1911: Fredrik Johan Leth
1903–1911: T J Dyrssen
1911–1918: Karl Toll
1918–1919: G A Lundeberg (acting)
1919–1922: Bo Tarras-Wahlberg
1922–1927: Lennart Lilliehöök
1928–1932: Thor Lagerheim
1932–1935: Sture Gadd
1935–1940: Hugo Gadd
1940–1945: Knut Gyllenstierna
1945–1950: Tor Hedqvist
1950–1951: Karl Ångström
1951–1954: Erik Kihlblom
1954–1957: Alarik Bergman
1957–1961: Nils Söderberg
1961–1963: Stig Löfgren
1963–1966: Stig Magneberg
1966–1966: Carl Arcadius Holger Areskoug (acting)
1966–1967: Harald Smith
1967–1978: Valter Thomé
1978–1986: Hans Richter
1986–1993: Leif Mårtensson
1993–1994: Kjell Åke Plantin (acting)
1994–1995: Kjell Åke Plantin
1995–2000: Rolf Ohrlander

Names, designations and locations

See also
List of Swedish artillery regiments

Footnotes

References

Notes

Print

Further reading

Artillery regiments of the Swedish Army
Military units and formations established in 1794
Military units and formations disestablished in 2000
1794 establishments in Sweden
2000 disestablishments in Sweden
Disbanded units and formations of Sweden
Hässleholm Garrison
Kristianstad Garrison